The Leda-class frigates, were a successful class of forty-seven British Royal Navy 38-gun sailing frigates constructed from 1805 to 1832. Based on a French design, the class came in five major groups, all with minor differences in their design. During their careers, they fought in the Napoleonic Wars and the War of 1812.

Origins
The design of the name ship,  of 1800, was based on Sané's design for the French . The British 44-gun fifth rate  captured  in 1782. (The British took Hébé into service as HMS Hebe but in 1805 renamed her HMS Blonde). The class of frigates built to the lines of Leda were in contemporary parlance called the 'Repeat Leda class'.

Pomone and Shannon, the second and third ship of the class respectively, was built using Josiah Brindley's patent method of construction which dispensed with 'lodging' and 'hanging knees', oak elements that had to be grown to shape. Oak suitable for shipbuilding had become increasingly difficult to obtain through the long period of warfare. Bindley's fastenings proved to be weak. Captain Philip Broke of Shannon claimed her topsides were weak and "worked like a basket."

Characteristics and performance
The vessels of the class were fast, most recording  large and  close-hauled. However, their French-style proportions made them unweatherly compared to frigates designed to British proportions (such as the ). Many captains requested additions to the frigates' false keels to remedy this. The Leda class stood to their canvas well and liked a stiff gale, but were prone to excessive pitching in very heavy seas. All captains complained of the class's poor stowage capacity, the result of their fine French underwater lines, but stowage improved after the introduction of iron fresh-water tanks. Lastly, captains considered the class to be "wet", a result of lively rolling and pitching causing seams to loosen.

Ships of the class

The name Leda was taken from Greek mythology, as was common at the time; the Greek Leda was a woman whom Zeus seduced while he was masquerading as a swan. After Leda, the Admiralty had no more ships to this design for several years. Then with the resumption of war with France either looming or under way, the Admiralty ordered eight further ships to this design in 1802-09:
, wrecked on The Needles in 1811.

 ex-Scamander

In 1812 the Admiralty ordered eight ships to be built of "fir" (actually, of red pine) instead of oak; these were sometimes called the Cydnus class:

The Admiralty ordered seven more vessels to this design in 1812–15, with those constructed in Britain reverting to oak and those constructed in Bombay using teak:

, has survived to the present day.

The Admiralty ordered another six vessels in 1816, but of a modified design that incorporated Sir Robert Seppings's circular stern and "small-timber" form of construction:

A further twenty-three ships were ordered to this modified design in 1817, although the last six were never completed, or not completed to this design:

, in 1866 became a hospital ship moored in Cardiff, which in 1905 was replaced by the Royal Hamadryad Hospital.

, used as a floating church in Cardiff from 1863 to 1891.

, completed 1856 as a screw frigate
, another sailing frigate that has survived to the present day.
, completed 1844 as a 19-gun sixth-rate corvette

The last six ships of the 1817 orders were never completed to this design:
HMS Pegasus - canceled 1831
HMS Nemesis - re-ordered to  design.
HMS Statira - re-ordered to Seringapatam-class design.
HMS Jason - re-ordered to Seringapatam-class design.
HMS Druid - re-ordered to Seringapatam-class design.
HMS Medusa - canceled 1831

Citations

References
Gardiner, Robert (2000) Frigates of the Napoleonic Wars, Chatham Publishing, London.

External links
Origin of the Leda-class frigate